Jänkänalusta is a settlement with less than 10 inhabitants, located at lake Kaalasjärvi at the road from Kiruna to Nikkaluokta.

References 

Populated places in Kiruna Municipality
Lapland (Sweden)